The World Inside is an album by Human Drama, released by Triple X in 1992. The album landed three videos, "Look into a Strangers Eyes", "Fascination and Fear" and "My Skin", onto Billboard's Top 40 Indie Video chart.

Track listing
 "The World Inside I: Nothing Ever Changes/The Enemy/Here I Will Stay"
 "The World Inside II"
 "My Skin"
 "Tears"
 "Look into a Strangers Eyes"
 "This Tangled Web"
 "Winters Life"
 "Fascination and Fear"
 "A Million Years"
 "Color Me Red"
 "Father Sing"
 "The Sound of the Rain"
 "Voices"
 "Fading Away"
 "Times Square"

References

1992 albums
Human Drama albums